This is the list of original television programs currently and formerly broadcast by &TV.

Currently broadcasts

Formerly broadcasts

Comedy series

Drama series

Reality shows

References

andTV
andTV